{{DISPLAYTITLE:C19H22FN3O3}}
The molecular formula C19H22FN3O3 (molar mass: 359.39 g/mol, exact mass: 359.1645 u) may refer to:

 Enrofloxacin (ENR)
 Grepafloxacin